The State Council Party and State Organizations Special Food Supply Center is a Chinese organisation established in April 2004. It was a collaborative organ of the State Council Veteran Cadre Activities Center National Organic Produce Supply. It is supported by the State Council Logistics Base, Central Security Bureau farms, and supply bases spread over all 13 provinces, municipalities directly under central government control and autonomous regions. These bases supply the 94 ministries' and commissions' veteran cadres with high quality organic food products. The State Council Party and State Organizations Special Food Supply Center carefully oversees the process by which all food products, tea, alcohol etc. are chosen. There are only a handful of products that merit the label "Special Product to Central Party and State Organs." All the organic produce is carefully selected according to international and national organic production standards, and inspected according to rigorous national approval processes. All corporations and centers that pass this supply system process are periodically reevaluated, and if their standards do not remain of the highest caliber they are excluded.

Controversy
China's latest Infant Milk Contamination scandal has sparked anger among the general populace because China's leaders do not have to worry about food safety concerns because they obtain their food from the Special Food Supply Center.

External links
Amid milk scare, China's elite get special food NY Daily News, 2008
In China, what you eat tells who you are Los Angeles Times, 2011

Government of China